In 2000 Tipperary competed in the National Hurling League and the Munster and All-Ireland championships. It was Nicky English's second year in charge of the team with Tommy Dunne also in his second year as team captain. Finches continued as sponsors of Tipperary GAA.

National Hurling League

Division 1B Table

Group stage

Division 1 Semi-final

Division 1 Final

2000 Munster Senior Hurling Championship

2000 All-Ireland Senior Hurling Championship

Awards
Tipperary won two All Star Awards with both Brendan Cummins and John Carroll winning for the first time.

References

External links
Tipperary GAA Archives 2000
2010 Teams and Results at Premierview

Tipp
Tipperary county hurling team seasons